Move was an Australia chain of fashion electronics stores, owned by Dick Smith Electronics. The first store opened at Emporium Melbourne on April 16, 2014.

The stores closed in 2016 after Dick Smith Electronics entered receivership.

References

Retail companies established in 2014
Retail companies disestablished in 2016
Australian companies disestablished in 2016
Australian companies established in 2014